Transmembrane and tetratricopeptide repeat containing 1 is a protein that in humans is encoded by the TMTC1 gene.

References

Further reading